Anderson Lopes Santos is a Paralympic athlete from Brazil competing mainly in category F37 throwing events.

Anderson won a bronze medal in the F36 discus throw at the 1996 Summer Paralympics. At the 2000 he won a bronze medal in the F37 discus as well as competing in the javelin throw.

Notes

References

External links
 

1970s births
Living people
Paralympic athletes of Brazil
Paralympic bronze medalists for Brazil
Paralympic medalists in athletics (track and field)
Athletes (track and field) at the 1996 Summer Paralympics
Athletes (track and field) at the 2000 Summer Paralympics
Medalists at the 1996 Summer Paralympics
Medalists at the 2000 Summer Paralympics
Medalists at the World Para Athletics Championships
Brazilian male discus throwers
21st-century Brazilian people
20th-century Brazilian people